Vazhuthacaud is located in Thiruvananthapuram, the capital of Kerala, India. The place is located 3 kilometres from the  Thiruvananthapuram Central Railway Station and 8 kilometres from the Thiruvananthapuram International Airport.

Vazhuthacaud is a residential as well as commercial area. The All India Radio center in Trivandrum is in Vazhuthacaud. It is home to many major educational as well as cultural institutions. Govt. College for Women, Cottonhill School, Trivandrum Club, Sree Moolam Club, Subramaniam Hall are situated here. The Kerala Forest Department has its headquarters here. Government College for Women, Thiruvananthapuram, also known as H.H. The Maharaja's College for Women, is one of the oldest undergraduate and postgraduate women's college located in Trivandrum, Kerala. It was established in the year 1864. Cotton Hill Girls Higher Secondary School, the largest girls school in Asia, is located here. The Tagore theatre situating here is one of the longstanding cultural edifices of Thiruvananthapuram city.

Seven-century-old temple of Lord Sree Mahaganapathi is situated at Vazhuthacaud.

References

External links
Vazhuthacaud on Wikimapia

Suburbs of Thiruvananthapuram